Fukashi may refer to:

 Fukashi, a Japanese fortress captured during the 16th-century Siege of Fukashi
 Fukashi, a stick-like wagashi made in Kawagoe, Saitama from wheat bran coated in brown sugar

People
, Japanese anime producer and head of the marketing and business development in the TV Tokyo organization department
 Fukashi Minamimura (1917–1990), Japanese baseball player
, Japanese kickboxer
, Japanese acquitted victim from the assassination of Empress Myeongseong

Fictional characters
, a character from the novel Subete ga F ni Naru

Japanese masculine given names